ASMS may stand for:
American Society for Mass Spectrometry, a professional society, as well as the society's annual meeting
Arkansas School for Mathematics, Sciences, and the Arts 
Association of Salaried Medical Specialists, a New Zealand trade union.
Australian Science and Mathematics School on the campus of Flinders University.
Annie Sullivan Middle School Franklin, Massachusetts
Advanced Surface Missile System – US naval combat system, predecessor of Aegis.
Alternative School for Math and Science in Corning, NY